The 2011 Masters (officially the 20111 Ladbrokes Mobile Masters) was a professional non-ranking snooker tournament held between 9–16 January 2011 at the Wembley Arena in London, England. This was the first time that the Masters was sponsored by Ladbrokes.

Mark Selby was the defending champion, but he lost in the first round 4–6 against Mark King.

The tournament made history, as it was the first to feature two Asian players in the final, as well as the first Masters final to feature two players not from the United Kingdom. Ding Junhui won in the final 10–4 against Marco Fu.

Field
Defending champion Mark Selby was the number 1 seed with World Champion Neil Robertson seeded 2. The remaining places were allocated to players based on the latest world rankings (revision 2). Jamie Cope was making his debut in the Masters.

Unlike all previous tournaments since 1990, there was no qualifying round and there was no wildcard hand-picked by World Snooker. This format has remained in place since.

Prize fund
The breakdown of prize money for this year is shown below:
Winner: £150,000
Runner-up: £75,000
Semi-finals: £30,000
Quarter-finals: £20,000
Last 16: £15,000
Highest break: £15,000
Total: £500,000

Main draw

Final

Century breaks
Total: 16
 142  Stephen Maguire
 139, 102  Mark King
 136, 130, 117, 109, 107  Marco Fu
 124, 124, 120, 108, 102  Ding Junhui
 115  Graeme Dott
 106  Mark Selby
 101  Jamie Cope

References

Masters (snooker)
Masters
Masters (snooker)
Masters (snooker)
January 2011 sports events in the United Kingdom